Léonie Jane Archer (born 25 April 1955 in Crosby, Lancashire) is an English author and a former Research Fellow in Environmental Studies at the Oxford Institute for Energy Studies.

Archer graduated from the University of Oxford in 1981, with ancient history honours, and became a Fellow in Jewish Studies of the Graeco-Roman Period, Oxford Centre for Hebrew Studies, and Junior Fellow, Wolfson College, Oxford. Besides publishing on environmental issues, her best known works involve Jewish women in ancient history, and the history of slavery. Her Price is Beyond Rubies: the Jewish Woman in Graeco-Roman Palestine was one of the first comprehensive studies on Jewish women in antiquity.

Works

Books

Edited by

Chapters

Journal articles

References

Living people
1955 births
20th-century English historians
English classical scholars
Women classical scholars
English women non-fiction writers
British women academics
Alumni of the University of Oxford
Fellows of Wolfson College, Oxford
Classical scholars of the University of Oxford
Academics of the Oxford Centre for Hebrew and Jewish Studies
Academics of the Oxford Institute for Energy Studies
People from Crosby, Merseyside